Kåre Marius Opdal (5 September 1931 – 8 May 2017) was a Norwegian alpine skier, born in Narvik. He competed in the downhill at the Winter Olympics in Cortina d'Ampezzo in 1956.

References

1931 births
2017 deaths
Alpine skiers at the 1956 Winter Olympics
Norwegian male alpine skiers
Olympic alpine skiers of Norway
People from Narvik
Sportspeople from Nordland